The Courtauld Institute of Art is a self-governing college of the University of London specialising in the study of the history of art and conservation. It is among the most prestigious specialist colleges for the study of the history of art in the world and is widely known for the disproportionate number of directors of major museums drawn from its small body of alumni.

Alumni 

 Pamela Askew, historian of Baroque art
 James Austin, fine-art and architectural photographer
 Reyner Banham, critic
 Emily Barr, writer
 Graham W. J. Beal, director, Detroit Institute of Arts (1999–2015)
 John Béchervaise, writer
 Naomi Beckwith, curator at the Museum of Contemporary Art, Chicago
 Olivier Berggruen, art historian and curator
 Ron Bloore, artist
 Alan Borg, director, Victoria and Albert Museum (1995–2001); director, Imperial War Museum (1982–1995); keeper, Sainsbury Centre for Visual Arts (1978–1982)
 Eve Borsook
 Sir Alan Bowness, director, Henry Moore Foundation, (1988–1994); director, Tate Gallery (1980–1988)
 Allan Braham
 Anita Brookner, novelist and art historian; winner of the 1984 Booker Prize
 Wolf Burchard, art historian, author and curator
 Aviva Burnstock, conservator
 Martin Butlin, art historian
 Edie Campbell, model
 Thomas P. Campbell, former director, Metropolitan Museum of Art, New York (2009–2017)
 Peter Cannon-Brookes, art historian and curator
 Edmund Capon, director, Art Gallery of New South Wales (1978–2011)
 Rafael Cardoso, Brazilian writer and art historian
 Nigel Carrington, vice-chancellor, University of the Arts London
 Charlie Casely-Hayford, fashion designer
 Cathleen Chaffee, curator, art historian, writer
 Noah Charney, art historian and novelist
 Bridget Cherry, architectural historian and series editor of the Pevsner Architectural Guides (1971–2002)
 Betty Churcher, director, National Gallery of Australia (1990–1997)
 T. J. Clark, art historian
 Joshua Compston, curator
 Henry Conway, socialite
 Robin Cormack, classicist and Byzantine art historian
 Nicholas Cullinan, director, National Portrait Gallery, London (2015–present) 
 William J. R. Curtis, architectural historian
 Melvin Day, artist and art historian
 Jeremy Deller, artist; winner of the 2004 Turner Prize 
 Anne d'Harnoncourt, director, Philadelphia Museum of Art (1982–2008)
 Emmanuel Di Donna, art dealer
 Kerry Downes, architectural historian
 Daisy Dunn, classicist, author, journalist and critic
 Nell Dunn, writer
 John Elderfield, chief curator of painting and sculpture, Museum of Modern Art, New York
 David Elliott, curator
 Lucy Ellmann, novelist
 Gabriele Finaldi, director, National Gallery (2015–present)
 Jonathan Foyle, architectural historian
 David Franklin, director, Cleveland Museum of Art (2010–2013)
 Stanisław Frenkiel, artist, art historian, head of art, Institute of Education
 Terry Friedman, art & architectural historian and curator
 Tamar Garb, art historian
 Julian Gardner, art historian
 Nicky Gavron, Deputy Mayor of London (2003–2004 and 2008–2012)
 Delia Gaze
 Roselee Goldberg, art historian and curator
 Cecil Gould, keeper, National Gallery (1973–1978)
 Andrew Graham-Dixon, critic
 Lindy Grant
 Theo Green, film composer
 Paul Greenhalgh, director, Sainsbury Centre for Visual Arts, Norwich (2010–present); director, Corcoran Gallery of Art, Washington, D.C. (2006–2010)
 Lavinia Greenlaw, poet and novelist
 William M. Griswold, director, Cleveland Museum of Art (2014–present)
 Mark Hallett, director of studies, Paul Mellon Centre for Studies in British Art
 Jenny Harper, director National Art Gallery, New Zealand (1990–1992), director Christchurch Art Gallery (2006–present)
 Rosemary Harris, children's book author
 Sumaya bint Hassan, Jordanian princess
 John Hayes, director, National Portrait Gallery (1974–94)
  Deborah Howard, art historian
 Alice Instone, painter
 Michael Jaffé
 Lee Johnson, art historian
 Nancy Johnson
 Sir Mark Jones, director, Victoria and Albert Museum (2001–11)
 Francis Robert Kelly
 Martin Kemp, art historian
 Michael Kitson
 Tim Knox, director of the Royal Collection Trust, former director, Fitzwilliam Museum, Cambridge
 Nicole Krauss, novelist
 Ellen Lanyon
 Narisa Levy of the royal family of Thailand
 Walter Liedtke
 Neil MacGregor, director, National Gallery (1987–2002), British Museum (2002–2015)
 Denis Mahon
 Carolyn Marino Malone
 Jonathan Mane-Wheoki, curator, author, museum professional
 Tim Marlow, critic
 Andrew Martindale
 Matthew McLendon, director, Fralin Museum of Art
 Lady Delia Millar, art historian
 Sir Oliver Millar, Surveyor of the Queen's Pictures
 Christopher P. Monkhouse, American architectural historian and curator
 Edward Morris (1940-2016), gallerist and art historian
 Peter Murray, art historian
 Helly Nahmad, London-based gallerist and art dealer
 George T. Noszlopy
 John Onians, art historian
 Rozsika Parker
 Lucy Peltz
 Nicholas Penny, director, National Gallery (2008–2015)
 Joachim Pissarro, art historian
 Amy Plum
 Griselda Pollock, art historian
 Elizabeth Prettejohn, art historian
 Vincent Price, actor
 Benedict Read
 Jane, Lady Roberts, former royal librarian, Windsor Castle
 Irit Rogoff, writer and curator
 Atticus Ross, film composer
 Xavier F. Salomon, Deputy Director and Peter Jay Sharp Chief Curator, The Frick Collection, New York. (2014-present)
 Aaron Scharf
 Sir Nicholas Serota, director, Tate (1988–present)
 Brian Sewell, critic
 Desmond Shawe-Taylor
 John Shearman, Renaissance art historian 
 Amanda Simpson (née Tomlinson)
 Iain Sinclair, novelist
 Bernard Smith, art historian
 David Solkin, dean and deputy director, Courtauld Institute of Art
 Alastair Sooke, art historian and journalist
 Roger Stalley, art historian
 Phoebe Stanton, PhD 1950, art historian, faculty at Johns Hopkins University (1955–1982)
 John Steer, art historian
 Alexander Sturgis
 Ann Sumner
 John Russell Taylor, film critic and author
 Michael R. Taylor, museum director
 Matthew Teitelbaum
 Simon Thurley, architectural historian, director of the Museum of London
 Roger Took
 Emily Tsingou
 Pamela Tudor-Craig
 Ernst Vegelin van Claerbergen, head of the Courtauld Gallery
 Jeff Wall, Canadian artist
 Giles Waterfield, novelist
 Alexandra Wedgwood
 Perdita Weeks
 Marian Wenzel
 Annabel J. Wharton, American art historian, Duke University
 David White, officer of arms
 John White, art historian
 Esmé Whittaker, curator at English Heritage
 Sarah Wilson, art historian
 Joanna Woodall
 Joan Elizabeth Woollard
 Giles Worsley
 Nicolai Tangen, Norwegian hedge fund manager and philanthropist credited with holding the biggest private collection of modernist Nordic art in the world
 Imogen Poots, actress
 Noah Horowitz, art historian and director of Americas for Art Basel's show in Miami Beach since 2015

References

 
Courtauld Institute of Art, alumni